Tommy Øren (born 10 May 1980 in Årdalstangen) is a retired Norwegian football striker.

He has played for Sogndal Fotball in his entire senior career, except for the seasons 2006 through 2009 when he played for Hamarkameratene. He has played once for the Norwegian national team.

External links

1980 births
Living people
People from Årdal
Norwegian footballers
Sogndal Fotball players
Hamarkameratene players
Eliteserien players
Norwegian First Division players
Norway international footballers
Association football forwards
Sportspeople from Vestland